Energy Flash: A Journey Through Rave Music and Dance Culture is a book by English music journalist Simon Reynolds which chronicles the development of dance and rave music from the mid 1980s to the early 2000s. The book was published in the United States under the title Generation Ecstasy: Into the World of Techno and Rave Culture.

The book was originally published in 1998, with the American edition following in 1999. An updated edition was published in 2008 and again in 2013 which charted the rise of dubstep and the popularity of EDM in America.

References

External links
Author blog

Music books